Keith Dudgeon (born 5 September 1946) is an Australian former cricketer. He played 41 first-class matches for Queensland between 1967 and 1975. This period is considered by the Queensland Bulls as 'not the best era for the Queensland Bulls', as the team came last in the Sheffield Shield competition eight times during the late 1960s and mid 1970s. 

Dudgeon played as a right-hand batsman, scoring a total of 1576 first-class runs at an average of 22.84, across 77 innings. His highest score was 85, and he scored nine scores of 50 runs or more across the course of his first-class career. In his debut match, played against Western Australia at the WACA, he scored 59 runs in the first innings, but was forced to retire hurt on 1 in the second innings after being struck in the head off a short delivery bowled by Graham McKenzie. His score of 85 came in 1971, again at the WACA ground against Western Australia, and his innings was finally ended with a catch taken by Rod Marsh off the bowling of Dennis Lillee. 

He also took 15 first-class wickets at an average of 24.33, with his best figures being 2/14, taken against South Australia at the Gabba in 1971. In 1968, while playing an Tour Match hosting the West Indies, Dudgeon took the wickets of Basil Butcher and Wes Hall, after the former had claimed Dudgeon's wicket earlier in the match. Following that tour of Australia, then-captain Richie Benaud commented that Butcher was 'the most difficult of all West Indians to dismiss'. In an exhibition match in November 1970, Dudgeon removed the famed English opener John Edrich who was playing for the Marylebone Cricket Club.  

He also represented Queensland eight times in List A cricket, scoring a total of 156 runs at an average of 26.00, with a top score of 43. In this format of cricket he also took 3 wickets at an average of 42.66, with a strike rate of 50.6. His best bowling figures from these eight matches were 2/21. 

Following his retirement from professional cricket, Dudgeon opened a specialist cricketing shop in the Brisbane suburb of The Gap, which has been in operation since 1980. Through this business Keith and his family support local cricket teams, such as the Valley District Cricket Club.

See also
 List of Queensland first-class cricketers

References

External links
 

1946 births
Living people
Australian cricketers
Queensland cricketers
Sportspeople from Cairns